Mebutizide is a diuretic.

Diuretics
Sulfonamides
Chloroarenes
Benzothiadiazines